Analogy is a cognitive process of transferring information or meaning from a particular subject to another.

Analogy may also refer to:
 Analogy (album), an album released in 1972 by the band Analogy
 Analogy (band), a German and Italian rock band active in the 1970s
 Analogy (biology), a similarity of trait or organ in two unrelated organisms

See also
Analog (disambiguation)